Wellcome Book Prize (2009–2019 — paused) is an annual British literary award sponsored by Wellcome Trust. In keeping with the vision and goals of Wellcome Trust, the Book Prize "celebrates the topics of health and medicine in literature", including fiction and non-fiction. The winner receives £30,000 making it "one of the most remunerative literature awards on offer."

The current prize for medicine in literature was inaugurated in 2009, but there was an older award with the same name. In 1998, Wellcome Trust began offering a prize that would enable a practicing life scientist to take time off and write a science book for the general reader. Applicants would submit a book outline and sample chapter, winners would then be obligated to write and publish the book. It appears the only winner was Michael J. Morgan for The Space Between Our Ears: How the Brain Represents Visual Space (2001), before the prize (for science writing) was discontinued.

From 2009 to 2012 it was called the Wellcome Trust Book Prize. In 2013 there was no award however there were changes to the prize including an increase in prize money from £25,000 to £30,000. The timetable of key dates is longlist in February, shortlist in March and winner in May.

In 2019, the prize announced that it had "decided to take a pause and reflect".

Winners and shortlisted nominees

References

External links
Wellcome Book Prize, official website.

 
Awards established in 2009
2009 establishments in the United Kingdom
British non-fiction literary awards
British fiction awards
Wellcome Trust